Dulu (also Romanized as Dūlū) is a village in Sivkanlu Rural District, in the Central District of Shirvan County, North Khorasan Province, Iran. At the 2006 census, its population was 133, in 29 families.

References 

Populated places in Shirvan County